The Coppa Italia Primavera (Italian for Spring Italian Cup) is an Italian football competition played by youth teams from Campionato Primavera. All players are under 20 of age. The first edition was held in the 1972–73 season.

Due to sponsorship reasons, the cup is officially called Primavera TIMvision Cup.

Format
The competition is played on a home and away basis. Two elimination rounds are played by the 32 worst clubs. The eight winners are then joined by the eight best clubs in the round of 16. Quarterfinals, semifinals and the finals follow. The champions are eligible for the Supercoppa Primavera.

Past winners

See also
Campionato Primavera
Coppa Italia
Serie A
Serie B

External links
 Official Website

Italian Cup Primavera
Under-20 association football